Itakura Katsuzumi was the first Itakura Daimyō of the Bitchū-Matsuyama Domain. He was eventually succeeded by Itakura Katsutake. His childhood name was Shinpei (新平).

Family
 Father: Itakura Shigeharu (1697-1724)
 Mother: Murai Clan's daughter
 Wife: Toda Tadami's daughter
 Concubines:
 Nezu clan's daughter
 Uehara clan's daughter
 Fukumura clan's daughter
 Children:
 Itakura Katsutake by Nezu clan's daughter
 Toda Mitsukuni
 Itakura Katsuyori by Nezu clan's daughter
 Itakura Katsumasa by Uehara clan's daughter
 Itakura Katsuyuki (1752-1773)
 Itakura Katsumine
 Ina Tadataka (1764-1794)
 Itakura Katsufusa
 daughter married Maeda Toshihisa
 daughter married Hori Naoyasu
 daughter married Kose Toshitaka
 daughter married Suganuma Sadatoshi
 daughter married Honda Tadamitsu

Title

1719 births
1769 deaths
Daimyo
Itakura clan